The Martyrdom of Saint Andrew may refer to:

The Martyrdom of Saint Andrew (Murillo)
The Martyrdom of Saint Andrew (Ribera)
The Martyrdom of Saint Andrew (Rubens)